Ray Greene (August 12, 1938 – June 17, 2022) was an American college football coach.  He was the 14th head coach at North Carolina Central University in Durham, North Carolina and he held that position for the 1978 season.  His coaching record at North Carolina Central was 3–8. He was born in Akron, Ohio.

Greene later became a special correspondent on WHNT-TV in Huntsville, Alabama.

Greene died on June 17, 2022, at the age of 83.

Head coaching record

References

1938 births
2022 deaths
Akron Zips football players
Alabama A&M Bulldogs football coaches
Alabama State Hornets football coaches
Iowa State Cyclones football coaches
Jackson State Tigers football coaches
Miami RedHawks football coaches
Michigan State Spartans football coaches
North Carolina Central Eagles football coaches
High school football coaches in Ohio
Players of American football from Akron, Ohio